Greenside or Green Side may refer to the following places:

England 
 Greenside, Cumbria, a location
 Green Side, a hill in the Lake District
 Greenside, Derbyshire, a location
 Greenside, Greater Manchester, a location
 Greenside, Tyne and Wear
 Greenside, West Yorkshire, a location
 Green Side, Kirklees, a location in West Yorkshire
 Green Side, Leeds, a location in West Yorkshire
 Greenside, properly Greenside House, a house in Sheffield, South Yorkshire

South Africa 
 Ext 44, Greenside, a township in Polokwane, South Africa 
 Greenside, Gauteng, Johannesburg
 Greenside High School
 Greenside Primary School
 Greenside, Mpumalanga